Ramal de Viana-Doca is a closed Portuguese railway branch line which connected the station of Viana do Castelo to the city's port. It was opened on 20 March 1924 and closed in mid-1988.

See also 
 List of railway lines in Portugal
 History of rail transport in Portugal

References

Sources

 

Iberian gauge railways

Railway lines in Portugal
Railway lines opened in 1924
Railway lines closed in 1988